Ludwik Józef Stasiak (13 August 1858, Bochnia - 3 December 1924, Bochnia) was a Polish painter, cartoonist, journalist, art historian and publisher. He was also the author of some popular historical novels.

Biography 
He was born to a middle-class family and his father worked in the Bochnia Salt Mine. When he was of age, he was sent to Kraków to attend a gymnasium. After graduating in 1879, he was undecided about his future, simultaneously studying philosophy at the Jagellonian University and painting at the Academy of Fine Arts. 

After two years, he decided to devote himself entirely to art. Izydor Jabłoński, Władysław Łuszczkiewicz, Florian Cynk, Leopold Löffler and Jan Matejko were among his teachers. During this time, he received several awards from the Kraków Society of Friends of Fine Arts. In 1886, he continued his studies in Vienna under August Eisenmenger and was later in Munich, where he studied with Alexander von Wagner and Alexander von Liezen-Mayer.

After returning home, he became a regular exhibitor with the Kraków Society, showing 142 works in all. He also had exhibits at the Zachęta. His first solo exhibit was in 1893. Two years later, after travelling in Austria and Germany, with a brief stay in Warsaw, he returned to Bochnia and opened a studio which became a gathering point for artists of the Young Poland movement.

In 1898, to counter the dominance of German and Austrian painters in the art print business, he founded the publishing house, "Bochni Wydawnictwo Obrazów Treści Religijnej", which later became the art publisher "Stella". He served as artistic director and many of the works presented were later issued as color postcards. In 1900, he helped organize a major exhibition of Polish artists in Kiev. 

After 1901, his interests turned from painting to literary work. He wrote historical novels, short stories and three volumes of humorous sketches, all of which proved to be very popular.  He also became interested in the sculptor Veit Stoss (Wit Stwosz), a major figure in Medieval Kraków. After extensive research, he concluded that Stoss was actually of Polish, not German origin, and wrote several works supporting that thesis.

The Bochnia City Council declared 2008 to be the "Year of Ludwik Stasiak".

Selected novels
 Brandenburg: kraina słowiańskich mogił (Brandenburg, a Land of Slavic Graves), A. A. Paryski, 1940
 W Zapadłym szybie (In the Sunken Glass), 1908 Full text @ Google Books
 Krwawe ręce (Bloody Hands), Księgarnia Maniszewskiego i Meinharta, 1907 
 Rycerze śpiący w Tatrach (Knights Asleep in the Tatra Mountains), Gebethner, 1907 Full text of Vol.1 @ Google Books

Further reading
Ludwik Stasiak 1858-1924: na granicy epok (exhibition catalog), Muzeum Stanisława Fischera, 1994

References

External links 

ArtNet: More works by Stasiak.

1858 births
1924 deaths
People from Bochnia
19th-century Polish painters
19th-century Polish male artists
20th-century Polish painters
20th-century Polish male artists
Polish journalists
Polish illustrators
Polish essayists
Polish male writers
Male essayists
Polish historical novelists
Polish male painters